Makrochori (before 1928: Κωνομπλάτη - Konomplati; Bulgarian and Macedonian: Кономлади, Konomladi), is a village of Kastoria regional unit in Western Macedonia, Greece.

History 
The castle of Makrochori is located 4 km west of the village, is considered a large organized facility. The settlement developed on the bank of the present river , reaches up to a point, its citadel, and hosted an important mining center of Orestis since in many places volumes of iron ore were found.

A village in Petrich Municipality, Blagoevgrad Province, Bulgaria, is named Novo Konomladi ("New Konomladi"). This is because it was mostly populated by Bulgarian refugees from Makrochori who moved to Bulgaria after the Balkan Wars of 1912–1913.

In the Greek census of 1920 there were 1031 people in Konomplati and the Greek census of 1928 recorded 802 village inhabitants. Following the Greek-Turkish population exchange, there were 2 refugee families (11 people) in 1928.

Νotable natives
 Mitre the Vlach (1873–1907), IMARO revolutionary
 Stoyan Christowe (1898–1995), American writer
 Nikos Gioutsos (1942– ), Greek football striker

References

Populated places in Kastoria (regional unit)